Parumarathupatti is a village in Tamil Nadu, India. It is located in Javathupatti Panchayat in Oddanchatram Taluk which is in Dindigul district.

Villages in Dindigul district